Bhat Vahis (or Bhat Banis)  were scrolls or records maintained by Bhatts also known as Bhatra. The majority of Bhat Sikhs originate from Punjab and were amongst the first followers of Guru Nanak. Bhat tradition and Sikh text states their ancestors came from Punjab, where the Raja Shivnabh and his kingdom became the original 16th century followers of Guru Nanak, the founder of Sikhism. The Raja's grandson Prince Baba Changa earned the title ‘Bhat Rai’ – the ‘Raja of Poets, and then settled himself and his followers all over India as missionaries to spread the word of Guru Nanak, where many northern Indians became Bhat Sikhs. The majority were from the northern Brahmin caste (Bhat clan),(Bhat (surname)) as the Prince Baba Changa shared the Brahmin heritage. The sangat also had many members from different areas of the Sikh caste spectrum, such as the Hindu Rajputs and Hindu Jats who joined due to Bhat Sikh missionary efforts. The Bhats also contributed 123 compositions in the Sri Guru Granth Sahib (pp.1389–1409), known as the "Bhata de Savaiyye". There hereditary occupations consisted of  bards, poets, missionaries, astrologists, genealogists, salesmen.

Bardic tradition as a source of Sikh history 

These bards constantly attended upon or visited their patron families reciting panegyrics to them and receiving customary rewards. They also collected information about births, deaths and marriages in the families and recorded it in their scrolls. These scrolls containing information going back to several past centuries formed the valued part of the bards` hereditary possessions. A group of Bhatts was introduced to Guru Arjan, Nanak V, by Bhatt Bhikha who had himself become a Sikh in the time of Guru Amar Das.

According to Bhai Gurdas, Varan, XI. 21, and Bhai Mani Singh, Sikhan di Bhagat Mala, he had once visited Guru Arjan with the sangat of Sultanpur Lodhi. Some of the Bhatts who came into the Sikh fold composed hymns in honour of the Gurus which were entered in the Guru Granth Sahib by Guru Arjan. These Bhatts and their successors too maintained their vahis in which they recorded information concerning the Gurus, their families and some of the eminent Sikhs. These old vahis are still preserved in the descendant families, now scattered mostly in Haryana state. Their script is bhattakshari, a kind of family code like lande or mahajani. During the late 1950s, a researcher, Giani Garja Singh, obtained Gurmukhi transcripts of some of the entries pertaining to the Guru period, from Guru Hargobind (15951644) to Guru Gobind singh ji. Some of these were published as footnotes to Shahid Bilas Bhai Mani Singh, edited by Giani Garja Singh and published by Punjabi Sahitya Akademi, Ludhiana, in 1961.

Reliability 

According to historians, Bhat Vahis have to be used with caution when retrieving contemporary evidences. There are Vahis that were written by Bhatts who were in attendance of the Gurus, such as Vahis written by Bhatt Narbud Singh who accompanied Guru Gobind Singh to Nanded, and on the other hand, there are also some of the Vahis that were not written as eyewitnesses but instead after the occurrence of an event.

Historian Harbans Singh mentions:On the whole, these Bhat Vahis are a mine of information of historical and sociological value. Historian Jeevan Deol while talking about Bhat Vahis says:The authenticity of some of the bhatt vahi extracts published by Garja Singh is, however, rendered doubtful by the fact that neither the originals nor the extracts made by him seem to be present in any institutional collection in the Punjab.Dr. Balwant Singh Dhillon mention:Guru Kian Sakhian is said to be largely based on the Bhatt Vahis which its author has got from his ancestors. Originally, he wrote it in Bhattakhri, a peculiar form of Devanagari without vowel symbols. In 1868 Chhajju Singh, a descendant of the author converted it into Gurmukhi. However, its original in Bhattakhri and its second version in Gurmukhi are no longer extant, which puts a big question mark on the very origin of this document.

See also 

 History of Sikhism
 Writers of the Guru Granth Sahib
 Sikh scriptures
 Sikh art and culture

References 

History of the Sikh gurus: a comprehensive study, Surjit Singh Gandhi

Punjab
History of Sikhism
Family registers
Indian genealogy